Engineering Colleges' Admission Test (ECAT) is a computer-based test conducted in the Punjab, Pakistan each year in May/June for admission in BE/BS/BSc Engineering degree. ECAT is conducted by the University of Engineering and Technology, Lahore. It was started in 1998 on the initiative of then Chief Minister Punjab Mian Muhammad Shahbaz Sharif to counter cheating in the examinations at that time.

Each year around 40,000 students attempt this test while there are around 3000 open merit seats in public sector engineering institutions of the Punjab.

ECAT is a prerequisite for admission in the University of Engineering and Technology, Lahore and its affiliated institutions and all other public sector engineering institutions in the Punjab. Some private institutions also require ECAT as a prerequisite.

History 
ECAT was leaked out in the year 2011. Since then, the test secrecy and difficulty level has been increased by UET. In the year 2020, test was shifted to computer-based mode by the collaboration of Virtual University of Pakistan

Test structure and scoring 
ECAT consists of 100 multiple choice questions. Each question carries 4 marks, with 1 mark deducted for each wrong answer. Total marks are 400. 30 questions are from Mathematics, 30 from Chemistry, 30 from Physics, 10 from English language.

Test Difficulty Level 
ECAT is widely considered as most difficult entrance test of any university in Pakistan, where only around 1-2% candidates are able to score 50% or above marks. In ECAT-2021, the average score was only 73 out of 400 (18.25%), lowest since the test started in 1998.

Average marks in ECAT from year 2011 to onwards are as below,

See also

 MCAT Pakistan
 National goods Testing Service
 Graduate Assessment Test
 Inter Services Selection Board

Standardised tests in Pakistan
Standardized tests for Engineering
Entrance examinations